Song Yi (born 31 October 1989 in Jingmen City, Hubei Province) is a Chinese actress. She is a Class of 2006 graduate of the Acting Department of the Central Academy of Drama and made her debut in the movie industry in 2009.

Career
In 2009, Song made her acting debut in the drama The Dream of Red Mansions (2010) by Li Shaohong, playing the character Xiangling, officially entered the film and television industry. In the same year, she played the second female Meng Dan in the movie Meng Erdong.

In January 2010, Song first time played as the heroine in starring in the revolutionary historical drama Mao Anying and playing Mao Anying's wife Liu Siqi. In October, in the comedy movie Love Repair Station, she played Wen Xue, a beautiful stewardess who pursued romance.

In March 2012, Song co-starred in the romantic drama The Hawthorn Tree Love with Li Guangjie and Wang Luodan, and played the role of Jing Qiu's best friend Zhong Ping. In order to get closer to the characters in the play, she resolutely cut off the long hair she had left for ten years. In May, she played the lively and cheerful "rich second generation" Cui Cui in the urban emotional drama Spicy Girlfriend's Happy Time. In July, she starring in the family drama As long as you live better than me, as Xia Xiaobai who was ruined with a happy life because of the grievances of the previous generation.

In January 2013, Song starring in the micro-film Smiling Cherry, playing the role of Zhang Xiaoyu, a college student village official who loves the villagers. In July, she co-starred with Yang Yang and Zhang Jiani in the anti-Japanese drama Ultimate Conquest, and played Tang Xueru, the daughter of the elder Tang Siye of Zhongyi Hall. In September, served as the host of the 24th Supermodel Contest Asia Pacific Finals. In November, she played the role of Nan Yan, a girl from the Western Regions, in the costume drama Detective Di Renjie's Love with the Flower and the Golden Man. In December, she starring in the drama Our Jing Ke written by Mo Yan, played the lonely and desolate female protagonist Yan Ji.

In February 2014, Song played Qin Qiuyu, the "Northern Oiran" in the costume drama Wrong Point Mandarin Duck. In June, she starring in the urban emotional drama Baby Project, changed the image of a lady in the past in the drama, played the character of Li Xiaoliang, a girl with pungent personality. In August, she co-starring with Qin Junjie and Guan Xiaotong in the ancient costume martial arts drama Tang Dynasty Boys, as the well-known and well-versed historian Wang Yan. In October, she co-starred with Huang Jue and Weizi in the anti-Japanese war drama Hero Sacrifice, she played Wang Ruoshi, a wealthy daughter with an elegant appearance and a strong heart. In November, she acted as the heroine of the military-themed TV series The King of Soldiers and played the role of nurse Xia Xiaoyu in the drama.

In July 2015, Song played the female college student Chen Jiamiao in the youth campus movie Gardenia Blossoms directed by He Jiong. In August, she co-starred in the spy war suspense drama The Disguiser with Hu Ge, Jin Dong, and Wang Kai. She attracted attention for her role as the tragic and ever-changing female agent Yu Manli in the drama. In November, she co-starred in the period drama Legendary Tycoon with Zhang Han, Ku Hye Sun, and Chen Qiao En, played the optimistic and tough girl Qu Meng. In December, in the urban romance drama Little Lover, she played the lively, cheerful and righteous girl Zubelai.

In February 2016, Song joined the urban music inspirational drama Summer Dreams Rhapsody and played a perverse and domineering violinist Shana. In March, co-starring with Park Hae Jin and Li Fei Er in the urban romance drama Far Away Love, she played the very scheming wealthy daughter Qiao Jiaying. In December, she starred in the spy war drama The Youth with Sharp Flames and played the role of Tang Buyu, a communist intelligence officer.

In February 2021 Song Yi's fame rose after playing her first leading role in a costume period drama My heroic husband starring alongside her highly acclaimed hit drama Joy of Life co-star Guo Qilin, the drama which immediately gained the public attention and hits the top of IQIYI heat index. This lead Song Yi to a top female heroine position and the female actress with the highest views in 2021. In December Song Yi also starred as the 2nd female lead in the highly popular drama Luoyang along Huang Xuan, Victoria Song, and Wang Yibo, this even furthers her recognition and success in 2021.

In May 2022 Song Yi starred in an Anti-narcotics crime drama Day Breaker which was positively received by the audiences.

Filmography

Film

Television series

Awards and nominations

References

1989 births
Living people
People from Jingmen
Actresses from Hubei
Central Academy of Drama alumni
21st-century Chinese actresses
Chinese television actresses
Chinese film actresses